Listed below are the dates and results for the 1958 FIFA World Cup qualification rounds for the European zone (UEFA). For an overview of the qualification rounds, see the article 1958 FIFA World Cup qualification.

Format
Sweden, the hosts of the World Cup, and West Germany, the defending champions, qualified automatically for the final tournament. The 27 teams were divided into 9 groups, each featuring 3 teams. The teams played against each other on a home-and-away basis with the  group winners qualified. One runner-up was randomly drawn for the CAR/AFC-UEFA play-off. East Germany, Iceland and the Soviet Union and took part for the first time. Albania were the only UEFA member not to enter.

Summary

Groups

Group 1

Group 2

Group 3

Group 4

Group 5

Group 6

Group 7

Group 8

Group 9

Inter-confederation play-off

Qualified Teams
The following 12 countries qualified for the 1958 FIFA World Cup

1 Bold indicates champions for that year. Italic indicates hosts for that year.
2Competed as Germany

Goalscorers

8 goals

 Tommy Taylor

7 goals

 Thadée Cisowski

5 goals

 Jackie Mudie

4 goals

 Paul Vandenberg
 Tadeusz Kraus
 John Atyeo
 Ferenc Machos
 Edward Jankowski
 Nikita Simonyan
 Ladislao Kubala

3 goals

 Gerhard Hanappi
 Maurice Willems
 Hristo Iliev
 Jean Vincent
 Dermot Curtis
 Abe Lenstra
 Noud van Melis
 Jimmy McIlroy
 Anatoli Ilyin
 Eduard Streltsov
 Des Palmer
 Muhamed Mujić

2 goals

 Hans Buzek
 Theodor Wagner
 Henri Coppens
 Victor Mees
 Richard Orlans
 Georgi Dimitrov
 Panayot Panayotov
 Ove Bech Nielsen
 Günther Wirth
 Duncan Edwards
 Célestin Oliver
 Roger Piantoni
 Joseph Ujlaki
 Lajos Csordás
 Nándor Hidegkuti
 Ríkharður Jónsson
 Þórður Jónsson
 Þórður Þórðarson
 Guido Gratton
 Cor van der Gijp
 Harald Hennum
 Lucjan Brychczy
 Gerard Cieślik
 Manuel Vasques
 Alexandru Ene
 Anatoli Isayev
 Igor Netto
 Estanislao Basora
 Alfredo di Stéfano
 Luis Suárez Miramontes
 Josef Hügi
 Roger Vonlanthen
 Ivor Allchurch
 Cliff Jones
 Miloš Milutinović

1 goal

 Robert Dienst
 Walter Haummer
 Karl Koller
 Ernst Kozlicek
 Helmut Senekowitsch
 Karl Stotz
 Otto Walzhofer
 André van Herpe
 Denis Houf
 André Piters
 Spiro Debarski
 Todor Diev
 Ivan Petkov Kolev
 Krum Yanev
 Vlastimil Bubník
 Pavol Molnár
 Anton Moravčík
 Ladislav Novák
 Aage Rou Jensen
 John Jensen
 Manfred Kaiser
 Helmut Müller
 Willy Tröger
 Johnny Haynes
 Olavi Lahtinen
 Mauri Vanhanen
 Said Brahimi
 René Dereuddre
 Maryan Wisnieski
 Kostas Nestoridis
 Vaggelis Panakis
 József Bozsik
 Károly Sándor
 Lajos Tichy
 George Cummins
 Johnny Gavin
 Alf Ringstead
 Sergio Cervato
 Dino da Costa
 Gino Pivatelli
 Jean-Pierre Fiedler
 Johnny Halsdorf
 Léon Letsch
 Toon Brusselers
 Coen Dillen
 Kees Rijvers
 Servaas Wilkes
 Billy Bingham
 Tommy Casey
 Wilbur Cush
 Billy Simpson
 Kjell Kristiansen
 Ginter Gawlik
 Matateu
 António Dias Teixeira
 Cornel Cacoveanu
 Titus Ozon
 Iosif Petschovsky
 Nicolae Tǎtaru
 John Hewie
 Tommy Ring
 Archie Robertson
 Alex Scott
 Gordon Smith
 Genrich Fedosov
 Valentin Kozmich Ivanov
 Boris Tatushin
 Yuri Voinov
 Miguel González
 Enrique Mateos
 Robert Ballaman
 Ferdinando Riva
 Dave Bowen
 Mel Charles
 Roy Vernon
 Dobrosav Krstić
 Aleksandar Petaković

1 own goal

 Edgar Falch (playing against Hungary)
 Ray Daniel (playing against Czechoslovakia)

See also 
 1958 FIFA World Cup qualification

References

External links 
 RSSSF.com

 
1958 FIFA World Cup qualification
FIFA World Cup qualification (UEFA)
1957–58 in European football